Nandyal–Yerraguntla section connects  of Nandyal district and Yerraguntla of Kadapa district in the Indian state of Andhra Pradesh. Further, this section converges with Nallapadu–Nandyal section at Nandyal. It is administered under Guntakal railway division of South Central Railway zone, except the Nandyal railway station which is under Guntur railway division. Jammalamadugu and Proddatur are the major towns through which the line passes.

History 

The railway section was sanctioned in the year 1996–97.

Train Services 

At present daily 3 pairs of Trains services operating in this section along with Freight Trains

 07285 HX - NDL Passenger
 17216 DMM - BZA Express 
 17262 Tpty - GNT Express

References 

Rail transport in Andhra Pradesh
Guntakal railway division
Guntur railway division
5 ft 6 in gauge railways in India